A-Sides, B-Sides & Suicides is a compilation album by the Finnish metal band Charon. It was released on June 22, 2010, containing old material, as well as unreleased stuff, such as b-sides and their first unreleased demo. The demo is very atypical for the band – it consists of black metal recordings without the vocals of JP Leppäluoto.

Track listing
All tracks by Charon

Disc 1
 "The Cure" (Previously unreleased) – 3:33
 "Ride On Tears" (From Songs for the Sinners) – 3:36
 "Religious/Delicious" (From The Dying Daylights) – 3:26
 "Craving" (From Downhearted) – 4:26
 "In Trust Of No One" (From The Dying Daylights) – 3:01
 "Four Seasons Rush" (From Tearstained) – 4:03
 "Sorrowbringer" (From Tearstained) – 4:44
 "Little Angel" (From Downhearted) – 3:30
 "Failed" (From The Dying Daylights) – 3:49
 "Breeze" (From Sorrowburn) – 3:35
 "Bitter Joy" (From Downhearted) – 3:52
 "Christina Bleeds" (From Tearstained) – 3:06
 "Colder" (From Songs for the Sinners) – 4:48
 "House Of The Silent" (From Songs for the Sinners) – 6:39
 "Sister Misery" (From Downhearted) – 3:44
 "As We Die" (From Tearstained) – 3:57
 "Morrow (Edit)" (Original from Sorrowburn, mix previously unreleased) – 7:22
 "Worthless" (From Tearstained) – 3:34
 "Sorrowsong" (From Downhearted) – 4:49

Disc 2
 "Intro" –
 "Divine" (From Ride on Tears Single) – 4:42
 "Built For My Ghosts" (From The Dying Daylights – digipack edition) – 3:41
 "The King Is Dead" (From Religious/Delicious Single) – 3:51
 "Give Nothing" (From Colder Single) – 3:24
 "Frail I Stand" (From Ride on Tears Single) –
 "Re-Collected" (From The Dying Daylights – digipack edition) – 3:49
 "Sun King" (Previously unreleased) – 4:24
 "Decline" (From Inexorable Reciprocation – 1993 Demo) –
 "Absolution True" (From promo – 1993 Demo) – 4:32
 "Psyche Sunset Access To Necropolis" (From promo – 1993 Demo) – 4:24
 "Maleficium" (From Dies Irae – 1994 Demo) – 4:13
 "Tempestars" (From Dies Irae – 1994 Demo) – 4:00
 "Nocturne" (From Dies Irae – 1994 Demo) – 51
 "Omega Vortex" (From Dies Irae – 1994 Demo) – 4:33
 "Kheimos" (From Pilgrimage-Promo – 1995 Demo) – 3:35
 "Nightwing" (From Pilgrimage-Promo – 1995 Demo) – 4:10
 "Aureole" (From Pilgrimage-Promo – 1995 Demo) – 3:29
 "Pilgrim" (From Pilgrimage-Promo – 1995 Demo) – 5:17

Personnel 

 Juha-Pekka "JP" Leppäluoto – vocals, piano
 Lauri Tuohimaa – guitar
 Antti Karihtala – drums
 Teemu Hautamäki – bass
 Jasse von Hast – guitar
 Pasi Sipilä – guitar

Charon (band) compilation albums
2010 compilation albums